The Ultimate Collection is a 2-CD compilation by British Afro rock band Osibisa with studio and live versions of songs from their previous albums. Issued 1997 by Snapper Music under license from Castle Copyrights Ltd.

Track listing

All tracks Original Bronze Recordings licensed from Castle Copyrights Ltd.
Tracks 1-3 and 5-6 © 1975, 8-12 © 1976 and 4 © 1977

Tracks 1-8 Original Bronze Recordings and tracks 9-12 Original Pye Recordings licensed from Castle Copyrights Ltd.
Tracks 1-8 © 1977 and 9-12 © 1980

Personnel
Teddy Osei – tenor and soprano saxophones, flute, African drums, lead vocals 
Mac Tontoh – trumpet, flugelhorn, kabassa, bells, vocals 
Sol Amarfio – drums, bongos, cowbells, congas, vocals 
Spartacus R – bass guitar
Dell Richardson – lead guitar, vocals
Robert Bailey – keyboards, timbales
Kofi Ayivor – congas, percussion
Jean Mandengue – bass guitar, percussion
Kiki Gyan – keyboards, percussion, vocals
Remi Kabaka – drums
Loughty Lasisi Amao – tenor and baritone saxophones, congas, percussion

Credits
Cover and logo by Roger Dean

Curiosities
Innersleeve liner notes bring interesting information: the credits of tracks Hamatten, Dawn and Woy Aya differ from previous spellings Hamattan, The Dawn and Woyaya.
The writing credits range from Y Sharp show the full names of musicians  Loughty Lasisi Amao, Robert McDonald Bailey, Solomon Amarfio (Sol), Roy O'Rielly Glasgow Bedeau (Spartacus R) and Whendell Korthrigh Richardson (Dell).
Musician Jean-Karl Dikoto Mandengue has his name spelled Madengue in the innesleeve.

References
All information gathered from inner notes of album The Ultimate Collection (Copyright © 1997 Snapper Music (SMDCD-110).

1997 compilation albums
Osibisa albums
Snapper Music compilation albums